A stinkpot or stink-pot was an incendiary and suffocating weapon used in the 19th century during the Qing Dynasty, especially in naval operations. 
It is an earthenware incendiary weapon part filled with sulphur, gunpowder, nails, and shot, while the other part was filled with noxious materials designed to emanate a highly unpleasant and suffocating smell to its enemies when ignited. 

British Admiral Sir William Robert Kennedy recorded the use of the stinkpot in 1856 during the Second Opium War in his book Hurrah for the Life of a Sailor - Fifty Years in the Royal Navy. He described it as:

Describing the method of use of the stinkpot, Kennedy writes:

Stinkpots were used in the War of 1812 by the British Navy during a bombardment of Stonington, Connecticut on August 9th, 1814. 

Rossiter Johnson in his book, "A History of the War of 1812-1815 between the United States and Great Britain", writes:

"It was toward evening when Hardy opened his ports and fired upon the town every kind of missile in use at that day--round-shot, grape-shot, canister, bomb-shells. carcasses, rockets, and stink-pots."

Stinkpots are mentioned in ‘The Siege of Krishnapur’, novel by J G Farrell.

See also
Stink bomb

References

Bombs
Chinese inventions
Naval weapons of China
Military history of the Qing dynasty
Sulfur